Tegan Jayne McPharlin (born 7 August 1988) is an Australian cricketer who plays as a right-handed batter and wicket-keeper for the Adelaide Strikers in the Women's Big Bash League (WBBL). She previously played for South Australia, announcing her retirement from state cricket in 2022.

McPharlin joined the Scorpions squad in 2007. She was named in the Strikers' squad for its inaugural WBBL01 season (2015–16), and since the commencement of the WBBL02 season (2016–17) she has been the Strikers' captain.

In November 2018, she was named in the Adelaide Strikers' squad for the 2018–19 Women's Big Bash League season.

References

External links

Tegan McPharlin at Cricket Australia

1988 births
Adelaide Strikers (WBBL) cricketers
Australian women cricketers
Cricketers from South Australia
Living people
People from Balaklava, South Australia
South Australian Scorpions cricketers